Mociu is a commune in Cluj County, Transylvania, Romania. It is composed of nine villages: Boteni (Botháza), Chesău (Mezőkeszü), Crișeni (Tótháza), Falca (Falka), Ghirișu Român (Mezőgyéres), Mociu, Roșieni (Bárányvölgy), Turmași (Tormásdűlő) and Zorenii de Vale.

Demographics 
According to the census from 2002 there was a total population of 3,494 people living in this commune. Of this population, 74.09% are ethnic Romanians, 17.02% are ethnic Hungarians and 8.84% ethnic Romani.

Natives
Marcel Socaciu

References

Atlasul localităților județului Cluj (Cluj County Localities Atlas), Suncart Publishing House, Cluj-Napoca, 

Communes in Cluj County
Localities in Transylvania